Chief Guest is a 1975 Indian Malayalam film, directed by A. B. Raj and produced by T. K. Balachandran. The film stars Prem Nazir, Jayabharathi, Adoor Bhasi and Muthukulam Raghavan Pillai in the lead roles. The film has musical score by A. T. Ummer.

Cast
 
Prem Nazir 
Jayabharathi 
Adoor Bhasi 
Muthukulam Raghavan Pillai 
Prema 
Sebastian 
Sreelatha Namboothiri 
T. R. Omana 
Karunakaran
Vijayanand 
Mancheri Chandran]
Paul Vengola 
A. Madhavan 
Alummoodan 
Aravindan 
Baby Sumathi 
Bahadoor 
Balaraj
C. A. Balan 
Girija
Joseph
K. P. Ummer 
Kaduvakulam Antony 
Kunchan 
Kuttan Pillai
Padma 
Prathapan
Radhamani 
Reena 
T. P. Madhavan 
T. R. Radhakrishnan 
Thankan
Treesa
Unni Warrier
Vanchiyoor Madhavan Nair 
Vijaya

Soundtrack
The music was composed by A. T. Ummer.

References

External links
 

1975 films
1970s Malayalam-language films